NIU College of Business (NIU COB) was established in 1961 and is AACSB accredited, the highest quality standard for business schools worldwide.

History 
In 1951, the Business Department was formed at Northern Illinois University (NIU). Originally housed in the former WWII barracks, located on the corner of Lucinda and Garden Road, the three faculty members of the new Business Department taught 11 business courses to their 43 business students.

Dr. Francis Geigle, as the first chair of the department, would see the Business Department outgrow the barracks, moving first to Altgeld Hall and then to McMurry Hall by the end of the decade.

During the next decade the Business Department became the NIU College of Business and moved to its new home in Wirtz Hall.

The following decades brought rapid growth and change in enrollment, faculty, and technology. Recognizing that technology was a driving force in the college's ability to offer a quality education, Barsema Hall, a state-of-the-art building, was built in 2002 and has become an important part of the educational process at NIU.

Departments 
Accountancy
Business Administration
Finance
Management
Marketing
Operations Management and Information Systems

Facilities 
Barsema Hall located on the Northern Illinois University Campus is the home of the NIU College of Business. Completed in 2002, the building is named after Dennis and Stacey Barsema, whose private donation allowed the construction of the new business building.

The 144,000 square foot facility combines classrooms, computer labs, a 375-seat auditorium, specialized labs, faculty and staff offices, and spaces for studying, meeting, and even eating. The core of the building contains a large atrium space complete with a cafe.

Rankings

Undergraduate program 
 #4 Best Undergrad Business School in Chicago – College Choice (2016). NIU Business is ranked #4 best undergrad business school in Chicago for its deep connections with Chicago's business community, providing many opportunities for students to engage with CEOs, executives, and entrepreneurs in the Chicago area.
 Top 15% and Among Nation's Best for 9 years – Businessweek (2016). NIU's College of Business continues to build on its strong reputation as one of the nation's best undergraduate business programs. Bloomberg Businessweek's 2016 survey of undergraduate programs places the college 79th best in the nation, out of the 550 U.S.-based AACSB-eligible business programs and up 30 spots from Bloomberg's previous ranking period. NIU is one of only three State of Illinois public universities to make this ranking, which is based on surveying nearly 30,000 students and recruiters at nearly 600 companies.
 Among Nation's Top 24% - US News & World Report (2016). The NIU College of Business undergraduate program is ranked in the top quarter of best business schools out of nearly 550 eligible U.S.-based AACSB accredited business programs. This ranking of best business schools is based entirely on AACSB Deans evaluation of program quality. This year, the ranking given to NIU Business by business Deans across the country also makes NIU Business the top-ranked public business program in Illinois outside of the U of I system.
 Best Return on Investment in Illinois and Among Best in Nation - Businessweek (2013). The NIU College of Business undergraduate program generates the best return-on-investment when compared with all the other business schools in the state of Illinois.
 Top 3 for 4 Consecutive Years. NIU's College of Business ranks 3rd nationally for integrating ethics in the curriculum (Businessweek 2013 rankings). Since the start of its specialty rankings in 2010, Businessweek has ranked the college in the top 3 nationally for 4 consecutive years in the area of ethics education: 3rd in 2013, 2nd in 2012, 3rd in 2011, and 2nd in 2010.

MBA program 
 Evening MBA and EMBA Rank in Tier One of a Global MBA survey (2016). The NIU College of Business evening MBA and its executive MBA formats were ranked in the top tier of their respective categories in CEO Magazine’s Global MBA Ranking.
 #95 best out of 700 eligible AACSB-accredited programs – U.S. News (2018). In its “2018 Best Business Schools” survey, U.S. News & World Report ranks NIU's Part-Time MBA program #95 best nationally,

Academic programs 
 NIU's Master of Accounting Science ranks 15th nationally in affordability – Accounting Degree Review (2016). The publication researched out-of-state tuition rates for AACSB-accredited graduate level accounting programs across the nation.
 NIU's Master of Accounting Science ranks 26th nationally – Accounting Degree Review (2016). Accounting Degree Review listed the college's accountancy graduate program 26th best in the country for 2016. The publication highlighted NIU's Master of Accounting Science program, which incorporates accounting knowledge with leadership and professional skills.
 Accountancy ranks among Top 25 Best Nationally - Public Accounting Report. NIU's undergraduate and graduate accountancy programs ranked among the Top 25 best in the nation according to the 2015 Annual Professors Survey conducted by Public Accounting Report (PAR). PAR's ranking places NIU's undergraduate accounting program 19th best nationally and NIU's master level accounting program 25th best nationally.
 Top 20 CPA Exam pass rate (2010). NIU accountancy students’ performance on the CPA exam has ranked among the best in the nation for three decades. In 2010, NIU placed among the top 20 out of more than 900 institutions.
 6 Specialty Areas ranked among Nation's Elite – Businessweek (2013). 2nd in ethics. 23rd in information systems. 24th in sustainability. 40th in marketing. 43rd in corporate strategy. 54th in accounting.
 Professional Sales is continually named one of the best sales program in North America by Sales Education Foundation.

Recognition 
 89% SAP TERP10 exam pass rate (2016). Since the 2015 launch of the OM&IS Department SAP TERP10 workshop, participating students have far exceeded the national pass rate of 65% (per SAP University Alliances).

Accreditation
The NIU College of Business is among an elite 4% of business schools worldwide to hold AACSB accreditation at all levels. AACSB accreditation is the most respected and highest credential of excellence for business and accounting schools around the world. NIU Business and its Department of Accountancy have achieved continuous AACSB accreditation since 1969 and 1983, respectively.

References

External links

Northern Illinois University
Business schools in Illinois